Bolteløkka is a neighbourhood in the borough St. Hanshaugen in Oslo, Norway. The neighbourhood is named after proprietor David Bolt. The Bolteløkka primary school was finished in 1898.

References

Neighbourhoods of Oslo